Srinivas Salver (born June 9, 1984) is an American cricketer. In October 2018, he was named in the United States' squad for the 2018–19 Regional Super50 tournament in the West Indies. He made his List A debut for the United States in the 2018–19 Regional Super50 tournament on October 6, 2018.

References

External links
 

1984 births
Living people
American cricketers
Place of birth missing (living people)